An Sae-Hee (born 8 February 1991) is a South Korean professional footballer who plays as a defender for Malaysia Super League club Penang. Besides South Korea, he has played in Malaysia and Vietnam.

Career

In 2016, Ahn signed for FC Anyang. On 30 December 2022, Ahn was announced that he will signed for Penang.He made his debut as a starting central defender in a pre-season game against Manjung City.

References

1991 births
Living people
South Korean footballers
Penang F.C. players